Onoto is an unincorporated community in Pocahontas County, West Virginia, United States. The community was possibly named after Onoto Watanna.

References

Unincorporated communities in Pocahontas County, West Virginia
Unincorporated communities in West Virginia